Sheikh Sujat Mia is a Bangladesh Nationalist Party politician and the former Member of Parliament from Habiganj-1. He was the member of parliament from 2011 to 2014 and sixth Jatiya Sangsad elections held on 15 February 1996

Career
Mia was elected to parliament in 2011 in a by-election from Habiganj-1 as a Bangladesh Nationalist Party candidate. The by-elections were called following the death of incumbent Member of Parliament Dewan Farid Gazi.

References

Bangladesh Nationalist Party politicians
Living people
9th Jatiya Sangsad members
Year of birth missing (living people)
6th Jatiya Sangsad members